Willughbeia is a genus of plant in the family Apocynaceae, first described as a genus in 1820. It is native to Southeast Asia with a few species in the Indian Subcontinent. Several species have edible fruits enjoyed in many countries.  Many species are vines with sticky latex.

Species

formerly included

References

 
Apocynaceae genera
Taxonomy articles created by Polbot